Nicholas Lyulph Russell, 6th Earl Russell (12 September 196817 August 2014), styled Viscount Amberley between 1987 and 2004, was the elder son of Conrad Russell, 5th Earl Russell and Elizabeth Russell (formerly Elizabeth Sanders). He succeeded to the Earldom of Russell on his father's death on 14 October 2004.

Like his grandfather, Bertrand Russell, he was an active member of the Campaign for Nuclear Disarmament, from his teenage years until his death.

By the House of Lords Act 1999, all but 92 hereditary peers were removed from the House of Lords – the abolition of which Russell advocated so he did not sit in the Lords.

Career
Russell was the disability rights campaigner for the Labour Party and was campaigns officer for the Royal National Institute of the Blind as well as Co-Chair and later sole Chair of DANDA:Developmental Adult Neurodiversity Association, an entirely user-led and user-run organisation, two of whose members and trustee-directors successfully asked the Disability Rights Commission (DRC) to set up a Neurodiversity Group, which was succeeded by the DRC Neurodiversity and Autism Action Group (NAAG), the only systematic  human rights examination of Neurodivergent Rights in the world to date by an official human rights body of national or international standing, reporting in 2007. He also trained the Metropolitan Police Service. He was a regional board member of the Co-operative Group and was active in the Co-operative Party, as well as SERA and Transport 2000.

He was also a longstanding national executive member of the Socialist Educational Association.

He was actively involved in Disability Labour and was a former chair of the group. He was Disability Labour's first representative on the Labour Party's National Policy Forum, the National Executive Committee's equalities sub-committee and the Socialist Societies executive.

On 7 May 2010 Russell was elected as Labour councillor for the Cann Hall ward of Waltham Forest London Borough Council, a position he held for a four-year term until May 2014.

Personal life and death
He lived with his fiancée Georgina Farrer in Leytonstone, until his sudden death from a presumed heart attack on 17 August 2014, aged 45.  An autopsy later confirmed the cause of death to have been due to a thrombosis.

Titles
 The Hon. Nicholas Russell (1968–1987)
 Viscount Amberley (1987–2004)
 The Rt. Hon. The Earl Russell (2004–2010)
 Councillor The Rt. Hon. The Earl Russell (2010-2014)
 The Rt. Hon. The Earl Russell (2014)

References

External links
 Cann Hall election results 2010
 Declaration of interests, including memberships of CND bodies

1968 births
2014 deaths
Earls Russell
Labour Party (UK) councillors
Councillors in the London Borough of Waltham Forest
Co-operative Party politicians
People educated at William Ellis School
Nicholas